The South Asian Health Foundation (SAHF) is a charity in the United Kingdom (UK), founded in 1999 by Kiran Patel and established to improve the health of the UK's South Asian population. In 2015, it was named ‘Diabetes Team of the Year’ at the 2015 British Medical Journal awards.

References

External links 

 Official website

Medical associations based in the United Kingdom
Organizations established in 1999
1999 establishments in the United Kingdom